Gracie Elizabeth Trotter (born August 27, 2001) is an American stock car racing driver. She last competed part-time in the ARCA Menards Series, driving the Nos. 15 and 25 Toyota Camrys for Venturini Motorsports. Trotter also competes for Rev Racing in the NASCAR Advance Auto Parts Weekly Series as part of NASCAR's Drive for Diversity program. She is best known for becoming the first female driver to win an ARCA-sanctioned race, doing so in the ARCA Menards Series West for Bill McAnally Racing in 2020.

Racing career

Early career
Trotter began racing go-karts at eight years old. Before racing stock cars, she competed in legends cars, becoming the first female driver to win in the Young Lions division at Charlotte Motor Speedway in 2017. Trotter also made her late model debut in 2017, driving for Bond Suss. She continued racing in the CARS Tour in 2018.

In October 2018, Trotter was selected as one of twelve drivers invited to NASCAR's Drive for Diversity combine. She was announced as a member of the program's 2019 class on December 6, earning her a late model contract with Rev Racing to compete in the NASCAR Whelen All-American Series. Trotter was selected to the program again in 2020.

2020–present: ARCA

On January 14, 2020, Trotter was announced as a driver for Bill McAnally Racing (BMR) in the ARCA Menards Series West, as well as for select ARCA Menards Series and ARCA Menards Series East races. Trotter finished 16th in her debut ARCA East race at New Smyrna Speedway, while engine issues left her 22nd in her ARCA Menards Series debut at Phoenix Raceway. In ARCA West, Trotter finished fourth in her debut race at the Las Vegas Motor Speedway (LVMS) Bullring, before the COVID-19 pandemic put the season on hold. She returned from the hiatus with a pair of seventh-place finishes, followed by a career-best third at Irwindale Speedway. At Douglas County Speedway, Trotter again earned a new career-best finish, placing second to race winner Blaine Perkins.

In September, Trotter won a late model race at Hickory Motor Speedway, becoming the fourth woman to do so. She then won her first ARCA West race on September 26 at the LVMS Bullring, making her the second female driver to win a West Series race and the first to win an event sanctioned by ARCA. Trotter passed Blaine Perkins and her BMR teammate Jesse Love by taking them three-wide on lap 54, going on to lead 95 of the race's 150 laps. Trotter's season ended with a ninth-place finish at Phoenix. She finished third in the final points standings and was the only West Series driver to finish in the top-ten in all eleven races throughout the season. Trotter was awarded the Wendell Scott Trailblazer Award on December 3.

On January 13, 2021, Venturini Motorsports announced that Trotter would compete part-time for the team in the 2021 ARCA Menards Series, driving the team's No. 15 and No. 25 Toyotas in a total of ten races.

Motorsports career results

ARCA Menards Series
(key) (Bold – Pole position awarded by qualifying time. Italics – Pole position earned by points standings or practice time. * – Most laps led.)

ARCA Menards Series East

ARCA Menards Series West

References

External links
 
 

Living people
2001 births
People from Denver, North Carolina
Racing drivers from North Carolina
NASCAR drivers
ARCA Menards Series drivers
American female racing drivers
21st-century American women